Cody Paul Ege (born May 8, 1991) is an American former professional baseball pitcher. He played in Major League Baseball (MLB) for the Miami Marlins and Los Angeles Angels.

Early life
Ege played high school baseball and basketball at Washington High School in Cherokee, Iowa during a period when Washington qualified for the state tournament every year since 2005. He first joined the varsity baseball team as an eighth-grader for the 2006 season. Teammate Matt Koch was a year older than Ege, and the two would continue to play together at the University of Louisville and ultimately both made the Major Leagues in 2016.

In 2007, Cherokee won the state championship in with a 31–2 record. The team lost in the state championship game in 2008. Ege pitched the state championship semifinal game against Dyersville Beckman, entering with a 9–0 record and 0.13 ERA. Ege recorded 13 strikeouts, but took the loss, 1–0.

During his senior year, Ege had a 6–2 record, pitched 59 innings, with a 0.83 ERA and 123 strikeouts, while hitting .461 with 9 HR and 34 RBIs. The team was defeated in the state quarterfinals by Kuemper Catholic High School, 3–0. Ege was selected as honorary captain for Class 2-A on the 2010 Iowa Newspaper Association All-State Baseball Team. Ege was a four-time Lakes Conference and All-District performer.

Ege played college baseball at the University of Louisville.

Career

Texas Rangers
He was drafted by the Texas Rangers in the 15th round of the 2013 Major League Baseball draft. He made his professional debut that year with the Spokane Indians and also spent time with the Hickory Crawdads and Myrtle Beach Pelicans. Ege spent 2014 with Myrtle Beach and started 2015 with the High Desert Mavericks before being promoted to the Double-A Frisco RoughRiders.

Miami Marlins
On July 31, 2015, Ege and Tomás Telis were traded to the Miami Marlins for Sam Dyson. The Marlins assigned him to the Jacksonville Suns before promoting him to the Triple-A New Orleans Zephyrs.

Ege made his major league debut on April 23, 2016.

Los Angeles Angels
Ege was claimed off waivers by the Los Angeles Angels on August 12, 2016. He was non-tendered on December 2. On January 7, 2017, Ege signed a minor league contract with the Angels. He elected free agency on November 6, 2017.

References

External links

Louisville Cardinals bio

1991 births
Living people
People from Sioux City, Iowa
Baseball players from Iowa
Major League Baseball pitchers
Miami Marlins players
Los Angeles Angels players
Louisville Cardinals baseball players
Spokane Indians players
Hickory Crawdads players
Myrtle Beach Pelicans players
High Desert Mavericks players
Frisco RoughRiders players
Jacksonville Suns players
New Orleans Zephyrs players
Salt Lake Bees players